Interlinguistics, as the science of planned languages, has existed for more than a century as a specific branch of linguistics for the study of various aspects of linguistic communication. Interlinguistics is a discipline formalized by Otto Jespersen in 1931 as the science of interlanguages, i.e. contact languages tailored for international communication. In more recent times, the object of study of interlinguistics was put into relation with language planning, the collection of strategies to deliberately influence the structure and function of a living language. In this framework, interlanguages become a subset of planned languages, i.e. extreme cases of language planning.

Interlinguistics first appeared as a branch of studies devoted to the establishment of norms for auxiliary languages, but over its century-long history it has been understood by different authors more and more broadly as an interdisciplinary branch of science which includes various aspects of communication, language planning and standardization, multilingualism and globalisation, language policy, translation, sociolinguistics, intercultural communication, the history of language creation and literature written in planned languages (international auxiliary languages (auxlangs) as well as constructed languages : conlangs), fictional artistic languages (artlangs), lingua francas, pidgins, creoles and constructed languages in the internet and other topics were added.

Etymology and history 
The hybrid term was first coined in French (as Interlinguistique) by the Belgian Esperantist Jules Meysmans.

The main historical periods of interlinguistics are:
 first, the pioneer era (1879–1911), when its basis was put forth; 
 secondly, the foundational era (1911–1951), when the interlinguistics wars took place to decide the most appropriate form of an auxiliary language; 
 thirdly, the school era (1951–1990), when independent Interlinguistics schools formed in different countries, mainly Germany, Hungary, Italy, the Netherlands, and Poland, each with particular attention to Esperanto; 
 lastly, the current era of language policy (1990–today), during which interlinguistics is more tightly integrated with other disciplines, mainly linguistics and various social and political sciences, particularly via the topics of globalism, linguistic justice, management of multilingualism, and new forms of mobility.

At the Institute of Linguistics of AMU there is the extramural Interlinguistic studies program. Over the course of three years these studies provide the students with a basic knowledge of general linguistics, interlinguistics, international and intercultural communication with a focus on the linguistics, culture and movement of the internationally dispersed and naturally functioning planned language Esperanto. Every third year the Interlinguistic Studies program also organizes an international interlinguistic symposium.

At the University of Amsterdam there is also a chair of interlinguistics and Esperanto.

Field of studies 
The field of interlinguistics is concerned with international planned languages [also called 'constructed languages', 'auxiliary languages', or 'artificial languages'] as Esperanto, and with the relationship between planned languages and language planning. Increasingly, undergraduate courses in planned languages are expanding to embrace not only the history of languages planned for international use, but also the field of imaginary and fictional languages. Interlinguistics is also concerned with investigating how ethnic and international planned languages work as lingua franca and with the possibilities of optimizing interlinguistic communication.

The term Interlinguistics can be interpreted in at least two ways:

 Study of  interlinguae, i.e., of interlanguages that serve for interlinguistic communication - not to be confused with the interim languages of language learners, which also came to be called "interlanguages" by some authors.
 Study of phenomena that can be observed inter linguae 'between languages'.
Among these interpretations, the first one is by far the most well established, while Mario Wandruszka had only the second one in mind.

The term appears first to have been used in French (interlinguistique) by Jules Meysmans in 1911 in a text concerning international auxiliary languages. It became more widely accepted subsequent to an address by the Danish linguist Otto Jespersen to the 2nd International Congress of Linguists in 1931. According to Jespersen, interlinguistics is "that branch of the science of language which deals with the structure and basic ideas of all languages with the view to the establishing of a norm for interlanguages, i.e. auxiliary languages destined for oral and written use between people who cannot make themselves understood by means of their mother tongues". According to this definition, investigations that are useful for optimizing interlinguistic communication are central to the discipline, and the purpose may be to develop a new language intended for international use or for use within a multilingual country or union. Research of this kind has been undertaken by the International Delegation, which developed Ido (1907), and by the International Auxiliary Language Association (IALA), which developed Interlingua (1951).

Valter Tauli considered interlinguistics as a subdiscipline of language planning. The principles recommended by him for language planning applied to the guided development of national languages are also, and more liberally so, applicable to constructed interlanguages. It is noteworthy that these principles have close counterparts among Grice's conversational maxims. These maxims describe how effective communication in conversation is achieved, and in order to function well, a language must be such that it allows respecting these maxims, which languages not always do.

Most publications in the field of interlinguistics are, however, not so constructive, but rather descriptive, comparative, historic, sociolinguistic, or concerned with translation by humans or machines. As for Esperanto, which is the most widely used constructed interlanguage, there is a relatively abundant literature about the language itself and its philology (see Esperantology).

Only a few of the many constructed languages have been applied practically to any noteworthy extent. The most prosperous were Volapük (1879, Johann Martin Schleyer), Esperanto (1887 Ludwik Lejzer Zamenhof), Latino sine flexione (1903, Giuseppe Peano), Ido (1907, Louis Couturat), Occidental-Interlingue (1922, Edgar de Wahl) and Interlingua (1951, IALA and Alexander Gode), with Esperanto being the one gathering the most significant community of active speakers at present. Here, the Bliss symbols (1949, Charles K. Bliss) deserve also to be mentioned. These were intended for international communication, but have found their field of application elsewhere, namely as an aid for persons who lack an adequate ability of using ordinary language, because of motorical or cognitive handicaps.

Kinds of interlanguages 
The following table lists only one representative for each type explicitly. 

  
Among constructed languages, it is usual to distinguish between a priori languages and a posteriori languages. The latter are based on one or, more often, several source languages, while this is not evident for a priori languages, e.g., the philosophical languages of the 17th century, Solresol and the logical languages of the 20th century, such as Loglan and Lojban.  Spontaneously arisen Interlanguages are necessarily a posteriori or iconic (using imaging or imitating signs).

Bibliography 
On the initiative of Klaus Schubert, Detlev Blanke's 1985 book "Internationale Plansprachen (Eine Einführung)" ["International Constructed Languages (An Introduction)"], still the standard German work on interlinguistics, is now available online. It can be downloaded, as scanned pages in a PDF file (250 MB in size), from the German National Library.
Gobbo, Federico, 2020, Introduction to Interlinguistics. Munich: GRIN Publishing
(eo) Vĕra Barandovská-Frank, (2020), Interlingvistiko. Enkonduko en la sciencon pri planlingvoj, 333 pp., Poznań, Univ. Adam Mickiewicz, 
Gode, Alexander, Interlingua: A Dictionary of the International Language. New York: Storm Publishers, 1951.
Interlinguistic Standardization, Historia de Interlingua, 2001, revised 2006.
Jespersen, Otto, Interlinguistics, International Communication, 1931.
 Schubert, Klaus (Ed.): Interlinguistics. Aspects of the Science of Planned Languages. Mouton de Gruyter, Berlin / New York 1989.
 Кузнецов, С.Н. (1987). Теоретические основы интерлингвистики. Москва: Издательство Университета дружбы народов. [Kuznetsov, S.N. (1987). Theoretical Foundations of Interlinguistics. Moscow: University of peoples friendship]
David J. Peterson. (2015), The art of language invention: From horse-lords to dark elves, the words behind the world-building, New York: Penguin, 292 pp.

External links
(plulingva) Language Problems and Language Planning (LPLP) is een 'peer-reviewed international and multilingual journal devoted to the study of multilingualism and language policy' en heeft geregeld een rubriek Interlinguistics / Interlingüística / Interlinguistik / Interlingvistiko

(de, en) Österreichische Nationalbibliothek (ÖNB) - fachbibliotek für Interlinguistik (academic library on interlinguistics)

(en, eo) Centre for Research and Documentation on World Language Problems (CED, Centro de Esploro kaj Dokumentado pri Mondaj Lingvaj Problemoj)

(eo, en) Journal Esperantologio / Esperanto Studies

(eo, fr) Centre de documentation et d'étude sur la langue internationale (CDELI)

(en) Interlinguistics and Esperanto studies

(pl) Język Komunikacja Informacia (JKI)

(en) "Interlinguistics", Lingvo.info

See also
 International auxiliary language
 Constructed language
 Conlanging, the art of crafting tongues
 Metalinguistics
 Translingualism

References

 
Language contact
Translation studies